The 2018 San Jose Earthquakes season is the club's 36th year of existence, their 21st season in Major League Soccer and their 11th consecutive season in the top-flight of American soccer.

Background 

The 2017 season was one of continued change under the leadership of general manager Jesse Fioranelli, with head coach Dominic Kinnear and assistant coach John Spencer being replaced by San Jose's technical director Chris Leitch and Director of Methodology Alex Covelo on June 25, 2017.  The San Jose Earthquakes finished the 2017 season with a victory over Minnesota United FC that sent them to the MLS playoffs for the first time since 2012.

On November 24, 2017, the Earthquakes announced their second coaching change of the year with Mikael Stahre taking on the role of head coach. Leitch and Covelo would return to their former positions of technical director and director of methodology respectively.

Current squad

Current roster 

As of June 13, 2018.

Non-competitive

Competitive

Major League Soccer

Standings 

Western Conference Table

Overall table

Results

U.S. Open Cup

The Earthquakes and all other MLS clubs join the U.S. Open Cup in round 4.

Player Statistics

Scoring leaders

Assist leaders

Player Awards

League

Player movement

In 
Per Major League Soccer and club policies terms of the deals do not get disclosed.

Out

Loans

In

Out

Draft picks

References

San Jose Earthquakes
San Jose Earthquakes seasons
San Jose Earthquakes
San Jose Earthquakes